The 2009–10 Luxembourg National Division (also known as BGL Ligue due to sponsorship reasons) was the 96th season of top-tier football in Luxembourg. It began on 2 August 2009 and ended on 29 May 2010. F91 Dudelange were the defending champions.

Team changes from 2008–09
SC Steinfort and FC Avenir Beggen were relegated to the Division of Honour after finishing 13th and 14th in 2008–09. They were replaced by Division of Honour 2008–09 champions CS Pétange and runners-up FC Mondercange.

US Rumelange as 12th-placed team had to compete in a single play-off match against 3rd-placed Division of Honour side FC Erpeldange 72. Rumelange won the match, 2–0, and thus retained their National Division status.

Stadia and locations

League table

Results

Relegation play-offs
12th-placed UN Käerjeng 97 competed in a relegation play-offs match against the third-placed team from the Division of Honour, CS Oberkorn, for one spot in next season's competition. UN Käerjeng 97 retained their spot in the league, beating CS Obercorn 3–1.

Top goalscorers

See also
 2009–10 Luxembourg Cup

References

Luxembourg National Division seasons
Lux
1